Avigdor (Victor) Aptowitzer (16 March 1871 – 5 December 1942) was a rabbinic and talmudic scholar.

Life
Aptowitzer was born in Ternopil (Galicia) on 16 March 1871 to parents Moshe Aaron Kasner and Tziril Aptowitzer. His father, who suffered from poor health, was the head of a small yeshiva and barely eked out a living. Avigdor helped out from the age of seven by tutoring students. The family was aligned with the Chortikov hassidic dynasty; they also  occasionally traveled to see the Rebbe (holy rabbi) of Husiaten.

While staying in Husiaten Avigdor came under the influence of a local maskil. He began learning science and gradually ceased to pay visits to the Rebbe of Husiaten. As a result, the Rebbe's disciples asked that he be drafted in the Army, and he indeed served in the Army. In 1896 Aptowitzer traveled to Chernowitz where he studied for his matriculation exam, which he passed. He made a living by teaching mathematics. In 1899 he received rabbinical ordination and became engaged to Malka Durnboim.

After his engagement Aptowitzer traveled to Vienna, in order to study at the University as well as at the Hebrew Teachers College. He was employed as the personal secretary to Abraham Epstein. In 1909, with the recommendation of David Zvi Miller, Aptowitzer was appointed as a lecturer at the Hebrew Teachers College to replace Meir Friedmann who had died. Solomon Schechter invited him to the United States in 1918 but Aptowitzer turned down the proposal. The scholar Hirsch Perez Chajes appointed him as a teacher in the Israelitisch-Theologischen Lehranstalt (Jewish Theological Seminary) he founded. Aptowitzer served as a professor of Talmud, Bible, Midrash and Jewish philosophy.

In 1924 Aptowitzer was invited to an academic position in Jerusalem but he turned down the offer because of his wife's illness. In 1938, after his wife died, Aptowitzer emigrated to Palestine, but by this time there was no position available for him. In Israel he was engaged primarily in editing his papers for publication. Aptowitzer died on 5 December 1942 and was buried in Jerusalem's Mount of Olives cemetery. In his last will and testament he asked that his tombstone only state that he edited the works of Ra'avyah; he also asked that his unpublished writings be burned. Throughout his life he suffered from a number of diseases and shortness of vision and in his later years he was blind.

Aptowitzer was an observant Jew, scrupulously observing Jewish ritual law. He belonged to the Mizrachi Zionist movement and he lectured in Vienna in Hebrew.

Works
Aptowitzer was a renaissance man – his expertise covered wide areas of Judaic studies, including Talmud, Bible, halachic literature – especially the period of the Geonim and  Rishonim – the literature of the aggadah, Jewish law and Jewish history.

His most important contribution is his edition of the work of Ra'avyah (Eliezer ben Yoel HaLevi) which includes a comprehensive scholarly  introduction and copious notes. The first volumes were published by the  Meḳiẓe Nirdamim society in Berlin in 1912 and in Jerusalem in 1935. He published a volume of corrections published in 1936 and the introduction in 1938.  Under the sponsorship of the Yad Harav Herzog Institute and the Harry Fischel Institute for Talmudic Research, the work was reprinted (3 volumes, not including the Introduction) and supplemented by a fourth volume (dealing with laws of persons) edited by Rabbis Eliyahu Friesman and She'ar Yashuv Cohen. Aptowitzer also published a comprehensive work in German on the readings of Holy Scripture in rabbinic literature entitled Das Schriftwort in Der Rabbinischen Literatur as well as:
 Abhandlungen Zur Erinnerung an Hirsch Perez Chajes
 Mehkarim be-sifrut ha-Geonim (Research in the Literature of the Gaonim), Jerusalem, 1941
 BEITRÄGE ZUR MOSAISCHEN REZEPTION IM ARMENISCHEN RECHT. In Kommission bei A. Hölder, Wien 1907
 The rewarding and punishing of animals and inanimate objects: On the Aggadic view of the world (1923)
 Observations on the criminal law of the Jews (1924)
 Kain und Abel in der Agada (Cain and Abel in the Aggada) (1922)
 Parteipolitik der Hasmonäerzeit im rabbinischen und pseudoepigraphischen Schrifttum. Wien, 1927
 The Celestial Temple as Viewed in the Aggadah
In addition Aptowitzer  published more than 350 articles in a number of languages; his articles appeared in almost every compilation of Jewish Studies that were published during his lifetime.

Students
Hanoch Albeck
Shalom Spiegel
Shimon Federbush
Yehoshua Horowitz
Salo Baron
Moshe Zucker

References

1871 births
1942 deaths
Writers from Ternopil
Ukrainian Jews
Talmudists
20th-century Austrian rabbis
Jews from Galicia (Eastern Europe)
Burials at the Jewish cemetery on the Mount of Olives
Jewish emigrants from Austria to Mandatory Palestine after the Anschluss